Lockville (also Ramsey's Mill) is an unincorporated community located in southeastern Chatham County, North Carolina, United States, near the community of Moncure.

References

Unincorporated communities in Chatham County, North Carolina
Unincorporated communities in North Carolina